The 1852 Acapulco earthquake occurred in Acapulco on 4 December 1852 and destroyed the town.

Description
The earthquake was registered at about 10:10 p.m. on 4 December 1852, totally destroying Acapulco. There were few deaths but many injuries. The cost of damage was estimated at $5 million or more. Despite fears that it would return and flood the town, the normal sea level was gradually restored.

According to a local newspaper published the next day: "Last night at 10:24 a strong earthquake was felt in this capital (Acapulco), which was tremulous at first, and in which later we thought we noticed three oscillations from North to south. The earthquake lasted about ten seconds and caused great alarm in the population. So far we do not know that any unfortunate accident has occurred."

Technical
The earthquake occurred on the Jalisco–Michoacán–Guerrero subduction zone. It was reported at 16 locationswith a maximum intensity at IX.

See also
List of historical earthquakes
List of earthquakes in Mexico

Notes

Sources

External links
Earthquake at Acapulco – The New York Times 29 December 1852

1852 earthquakes
1852 in Mexico
December 1852 events
Earthquakes in Mexico
Acapulco
1852 disasters in North America